Yos or YOS may refer to:

Owen Sound Billy Bishop Regional Airport in Owen Sound, Ontario, Canada (IATA Code: YOS)
Youthful Offender System, a maximum security prison in Pueblo, Colorado
Yös exam, Turkish entrance examination
Yos Sudarso, Indonesian naval officer
Yos Por, Cambodian politician
Yos Son, Cambodian politician
Somporn Yos, Thai footballer

See also
Yos Sudarso Island in Papua province, Indonesia
Yos Sudarso Bay in Indonesia
Yot (disambiguation)
Yosemite (disambiguation)